Fen Road Bridge or Fen Causeway Bridge is the third river Cam bridge overall and the first road bridge on its upstream in Cambridge.
The road was formally opened on 9 December 1926.

See also
List of bridges in Cambridge
Template:River Cam map

References

Bridges in Cambridge
Bridges across the River Cam
Road bridges in England
Arch bridges in England
Concrete bridges in the United Kingdom
Bridges completed in 1926